Sailing rigs describe the arrangement of sailing vessels' rig components, including their spars, rigging, and sails. Examples include a schooner rig, cutter rig, junk rig, etc. Rigs may be broadly categorized as fore-and-aft and square-rigged. They may incorporate a mixture of both categories. Within the fore-and-aft category there is a variety of triangular and quadrilateral sail shapes. Spars or battens may be used to help shape a given kind of sail. Each rig may be described with a sail plan—formally, a drawing of a vessel, viewed from the side.

Modern examples of single-person sailing craft, such as windsurfers, iceboats, and land-sailing craft, typically have uncomplicated rigs with a single sail on a mast with a boom.

Introduction 
In the English language, ships were usually described, until the end of the eighteenth century, in terms of their type of hull design. Using the type of rig as the main type identifer for a vessel became common only in the nineteenth century. Many of these full-rigged ships (square rigged on all of three masts) had the hull type "bark"another common classification was "cat". In the second half of the eighteenth century, the square sails on the mizzen were often eliminated. The resulting rig acquired the name of the hull type: initially as "bark" and soon as "barque". This explains the Royal Navy's description of Endeavour as a "cat-built bark".

Design 
A well-designed sail plan should be balanced, requiring only light forces on the helm to keep the sailing craft on course. The fore-and-aft center of effort on a sail plan is usually slightly behind the center of resistance of the hull, so that the sailing craft will tend to turn into the wind if the helm is unattended. The height of the sail plan's center of effort above the surface is limited by the sailing craft's ability to avoid capsize, which is a function of its hull shape, ballast, or hull spacing (in the case of catamarans and trimarans).

Types of rig

 Fore-and-aft rig features sails that run fore and aft (along the length of the sailing craft), controlled by lines called "sheets", that changes sides, as the bow passes through the wind from one side of the craft to the other. Fore-and-aft rig variants include:
Bermuda rig (also known as a Marconi rig) features a three-sided mainsail.
Gaff rig features a four-sided mainsail with the upper edge made fast to a spar called a gaff.
 Spritsail rig features a four-sided boomless mainsail with the aft upper corner supported by a spar called a sprit.
Lateen rig features a three-sided sail set on a long yard, mounted at an angle on the mast and running in a fore-and-aft direction.
Crab claw sail (also known as Oceanic sprit or Oceanic lateen) features a three-sided sail with spars on both the foot and the head. It's either mastless, supported by a "prop", or mounted on removable or fixed masts.
Tanja sail (also known as canted square/rectangular sail, balance lugsail, or boomed lugsail) features a four-sided sail with spars on both the foot and the head. It's mounted on removable or fixed masts.
 Square rig features sails set square to the mast from a yard, a spar running transversely in relation to the hull (athwartships). Although these sails are more or less "square" (trapezoid) in appearance, this is not the reason they are referred to as "square". In ships built using older designs of the square rig, sailors would have to climb the rigging and walk out on footropes under the yard to furl and unfurl the sails. In a modern square rigged design the crew can furl and unfurl sails by remote control from the deck. Some cruising craft with fore-and-aft sails will carry a small square sail with top and bottom yards that are easily rigged and hauled up from the deck; such a sail is used as the only sail when running downwind under storm conditions, as the vessel becomes much easier to handle than under its usual sails, even if they are severely reefed (shortened). A modern version of this rig is the German-engineered DynaRig which has its yards fixed permanently in place on its rotating masts and has twice the efficiency of operation of the traditional square rig.

Types of sail
Each form of rig requires its own type of sails. Among them are:
 A staysail (pronounced stays'l) is a fore-and-aft sail whose leading edge (or luff) is hanked to a stay.
 A headsail is any sail forward of the foremost mast on a sailing boat. It is usually a fore-and-aft sail, but on older sailing ships would include a square-sail on a bowsprit.
 A jib is a headsail that is set in front of any other headsails, or in modern usage, may be the only headsail. It may be hanked to a stay, used in roller reefing or set flying (as in the more traditional cutter rigs). In a large vessel with many headsails, you may, for example, find a flying jib, outer-jib, inner-jib and then the fore-staysail.
 A genoa is a large jib that increases area by extending rearward of the mast.
 A spinnaker is a full sail of light material for use when sailing downwind in light airs. When in use, the jib or genoa would be lowered.
 A gennaker is a sail that is a cross between a genoa and a spinnaker.
 A mainsail ("mains'l") is a sail attached to the main mast. The principal types include:
 A square-rig mainsail is a square sail attached at the bottom of the main mast.
 A Bermuda-rig mainsail is a triangular sail with the luff attached to the mast with the foot or lower edge generally attached to a boom.
 A gaff-rig mainsail is a quadrilateral sail whose head is supported by a gaff.
 A spritsail-rig mainsail is a quadrilateral sail whose aft head is supported by a sprit.
 A lug sail is an asymmetric quadrilateral sail suspended on a spar and hoisted up the mast as a fore-and-aft sail.
 A mizzen sail is a small triangular or quadrilateral sail at the stern of a boat.
 A steadying sail is a mizzen sail on motor vessels such as old-fashioned drifters and navy ships (such as ). The sail's prime function is to reduce rolling rather than to provide drive.

European and American vessels 
Ships that sailed from Europe and the Americas could be categorized in a variety of ways, by number of masts and by sailing rig.

Single-masted sailing vessels include the catboat, cutter and sloop. Two-masted vessels include the bilander, brig, brigantine, ketch, schooner, snow, and yawl. Three-masted vessels include the barque, barquentine, polacre and full-rigged ship. Luggers could have one or two masts and schooners could have two or more masts.

Square-rigged masts 

A three-masted vessel has, from front to back, a foremast, mainmast and mizzenmast. A two-masted vessel has a mainmast, the other being a foremast or mizzen. Ships with more than three masts may simply number them or use another scheme, as with the five-masted Preussen.

On a square-sailed vessel, the sails of each mast are named by the mast and position on the mast. For instance, on the mainmast (from bottom to top): 
 main course
 main topsail
 main topgallant ("t'gallant")
 main royal
 main skysail
 main moonraker. 

On many ships, sails above the top (a platform just above the lowest sail on the fore, main and mizzens masts) were mounted on separate mast segments—"topmasts" or "topgallant masts"—held in wooden sockets called "trestletrees". These masts and their stays could be rigged or struck as the weather conditions required, or for maintenance and repair.

In light breezes, the working square sails would be supplemented by studding sails ("stuns'l") out on the ends of the yardarms. These were called as a regular sail, with the addition of "studding". For example, the main top studding sail.

Between the main mast and mizzen as well as between main mast and foremast, the staysails between the masts are named from the sail immediately below the highest attachment point of the stay holding up that staysail. Thus, the mizzen topgallant staysail can be found dangling from the stay leading from above the mizzen (third) mast's topgallant sail (i.e., from the mizzen topgallant yard) to at least one and usually two sails down from that on the main mast (the slope of the top edge of all staysail lines runs from a higher point nearer the stern to a lower point towards the bow).

The jibs (the staysails between the foremast and the bowsprit) are named (from inner to outer most) fore topmast staysail (or foretop stay), inner jib, outer jib and flying jib. Many of the jibs' stays meet the foremast just above the fore topgallant. A fore royal staysail may also be set.

Austronesian and Asian vessels

Austronesian 

Austronesian sailing rigs, include vessels with crab-claw and tanja sails.
The seafaring Austronesian peoples independently developed various sail types during the Neolithic, beginning with the crab claw sail (also misleadingly called the "oceanic lateen" or the "oceanic sprit") at around 1500 BCE. They are used throughout the range of the Austronesian Expansion, from Maritime Southeast Asia, to Micronesia, Island Melanesia, Polynesia, and Madagascar. Crab claw sails are rigged fore-and-aft and can be tilted and rotated relative to the wind. They evolved from "V"-shaped perpendicular square sails in which the two spars converge at the base of the hull. The simplest form of the crab claw sail (also with the widest distribution) is composed of a triangular sail supported by two light spars (sometimes erroneously called "sprits") on each side. They were originally mastless, and the entire assembly was taken down when the sails were lowered.

The proa is a single-outrigger Austronesian boat with one sail. Both ends are alike, and the boat is sailed in either direction, but it has a fixed leeward side and a windward side. The boat is shunted from beam reach to beam reach to change direction, with the wind over the side, a low-force procedure. The bottom corner of the crabclaw sail is moved to the other end, which becomes the bow as the boat sets off back the way it came. The mast usually hinges, adjusting the rake or angle of the mast. The proa is a low-stress rig, which can be built with simple tools and low-tech materials, but it is extremely fast. On a beam reach, it may be the fastest simple rig.

Asian 
Junk rigs were in use in China by around the 12th century. Iconographic remains show that Chinese ships before the 12th century used square sails.

In its most traditional form the junk rig is carried on an unstayed mast (i.e. a mast without shrouds or stays, supported only on the step at the keelson and the partners); however, standing rigging of some kind is not uncommon. It is typical to run the halyards (lines used to raise and lower the sail) and sheets (lines used to trim the sail) to the companionway on a junk-rigged boat. This means that typical sailhandling can be performed from the relative safety of the cockpit, or even while the crew is below deck.

Junk sails are typically carried on a mast which rakes (slants) forward a few degrees from vertical. The forward rake of the sail encourages the sail to swing out, which makes the use of a preventer unnecessary. Another way to say this is that the sail is stable when swung out and doesn't return to the middle of the ship when the wind drops.

Gallery of rigs 
Presented alphabetically by section:

Fore-and-aft

Square
With square sails on every mast

Combination
With some masts having exclusively fore-and-aft sails

Sail plans

Each rig may be described with a sail plan—a drawing of a vessel, viewed from the side, depicting its sails, the spars that carry them and some of the rigging that supports the rig. By extension, "sail plan" describes the arrangement of sails on a vessel.

See also
 Glossary of nautical terms (A-L)
 Glossary of nautical terms (M-Z)
 Kite rig
 Rigging

Notes

References

Further reading

External links 

Sailing rigs and rigging
Shipbuilding
Age of Sail
Tall ships